The International Defensive Pistol Association (IDPA), founded in 1996, is an organization based in Bogata, Texas, that has created a shooting sport based on defensive pistol techniques, using equipment including full-charge service ammunition to solve simulated "real world" self-defense scenarios. Shooters competing in defensive pistol events are required to use practical handguns and holsters that are deemed suitable for self-defense use and concealment garment that can conceal the handgun from view of bystanders.

The sport came about as a response to the perceived shortcomings in competitions organized by the United States Practical Shooting Association (USPSA) and its migration away from the use of common, un-customized handguns.  It was decided by the founders of IDPA (Bill Wilson, John Sayle, Ken Hackathorn, Dick Thomas, Walt Rauch and Larry Vickers), that USPSA competitions had become too far removed from the reality of defensive shooting situations, using extensively modified guns, handmade ammunition, and speed-draw holsters that were impractical for self-defense. The IDPA founders believed that USPSA matches had become "equipment races", which were heavily dependent on a shooter's gear rather than their ability.

In order to keep the sport in line with its founding principles, allowable alterations to the competition gear (including pistol or pistol caliber carbine) are carefully regulated in IDPA. Ammunition capacity is limited compared to some other action shooting sports in order to keep the playing field level for competitors from states that ban higher capacity magazines.

Scoring
Scoring at each match is based on the time taken to shoot the stage plus time added for any penalties accrued. Penalties are given for poor marksmanship (i.e. posting hits outside the targets' highest scoring area), failure to use cover, failure to follow a Safety Officer's directions, or any violation of IDPA rules. Penalties range from one second per dropped point on targets up to 20 seconds for a Failure to Do Right which is a blatant violation of IDPA rules—i.e. cheating or unsportsmanlike conduct.

Unlimited Scoring
Most IDPA stages are scored using Unlimited Scoring (previously known as Vickers Count) which means that shooters may fire as many rounds as they feel necessary to make the specified number of hits. The best hits on the target are the only ones that count for score. If a stage calls for two hits on each target, a shooter may fire as many rounds as desired and no penalty will be given. Only the best two hits will count.

Limited Scoring
On a standards stage (an exercise intended to test marksmanship and gun handling skill as opposed to being a scenario) it is common for the course of fire to specify Limited scoring (previously known as Limited-Vickers). On this type of stage, the shooter may fire no more than the number of rounds specified. Firing more rounds will earn a procedural penalty and only the lowest scoring hits on target, of the number specified in the course of fire, are counted.  For example: a Limited Scoring stage calls for two shots fired; the shooter fires one round into the -0 zone and one round into the -1 zone; if they fire again, hitting the -0 zone; when the target is scored, only the -0 and -1 zone hits will count. The "make up" -0 shot will be thrown out (not because it is the make up, but because is a higher score and the rationale is there should be no possible advantage accrued from failing to follow the stage procedure) and the shooter will be assessed a procedural penalty for firing more shots than the course called for. In addition, the shooter will have also added to their score by taking the time to fire the extra round.

Points Down
Originally the IDPA target was marked with two 5-point zones (head and  circle in center), a 4-point zone (a polygonal box around the circle), and a 2-point zone (the outside periphery of the target). However, since scoring is obtained not by calculating points obtained but by subtracting points dropped, the scoring zones came to reflect that system.

The current standard IDPA target is a cardboard humanoid shape with scoring zones perforated onto its surface. There are two areas marked as "-0" or "down zero" (the head and center-mass of the body represented by a circle, which has been moved up from its original position to be higher in the target body, thus more closely approximating the location of the heart and surrounding arteries) and two marked "-1" (the area outside the -0 in the head and in the body) and one marked"-3".

Hits in each zone are added to the total points down. A target calling for two hits, with one hit in both the "-1" and "-3" zones would be scored as "-4" and called as "down-4." Only the shooter's best hits are scored unless a stage is specified as Limited Scoring. A Limited Scoring stage specifies the number of shots that can be taken at a target. Additional shots taken past the specified number results in a procedural penalty, in addition to which only the lowest-scoring shots are recorded. A miss on a target is scored as down-5.

One second per point down is added to the total time taken to shoot the stage.

Prior to 2017, only half a second per point down was added to the stage time. Also, a 5-second "failure to neutralize" penalty existed for not getting at least one hit within the down-0 or down-1 zones of a threat target.

Penalties

Hit on Non-Threat (HNT)
All targets identified with two open hands are considered to be a "non-threat". Shots that hit a non-threat in a scoring zone will result in a 5-second penalty being assessed for every hit.

Procedural Error (PE)
A procedural error is a 3-second penalty given for breaking the rules of IDPA or failing to follow the directions of a course of fire.

Procedurals may be assessed by the safety officer for infractions such as:
 Stepping over the foot fault line while engaging a target at a Point of Cover
 Shooting targets in the wrong order
 Failing to follow the directions for the stage
 Leaving ammunition behind after performing a tactical reload (reload with retention)

Flagrant Penalty (FP)
A flagrant penalty is a 10-second penalty given in place of a PE when a competitive advantage worth more than the 3-second PE penalty is gained by an infraction that would normally draw a PE.

Flagrants may be assessed by the safety officer (with approval from the match director) for infractions such as:
 Shooting with two hands when the directions call for one-handed shooting
 Standing completely outside of cover when instructed to use cover
 Loading more rounds in magazines than allowed

Failure to Do Right (FTDR)
A failure to do right is a 20-second penalty given for "gross unsportsmanlike conduct". This penalty can be highly subjective, and the safety officer (with approval from the match director) has to determine that the shooter engaged in the action with a "guilty mind"—that he knowingly failed to do right. Because of the subjectivity of the call, the penalty is seldom given. Receiving one all but guarantees the shooter will lose the match, or at least place low in his or her division. FTDRs are specifically meant to address intentional violations of the rule book that allow a competitor to gain a competitive advantage greater than 10 seconds. If the competitive advantage from the rule violation can be negated with an FP or PE, than an FTDR shouldn't be used. One of the few known examples of an FTDR from a sanctioned match was for a competitor who, even after receiving multiple warnings, refused to help paste targets to reset stages.

Equipment

Firearms
IDPA currently recognizes nine divisions of competition, with each division having different limitations for the firearms.  The Revolver (REV) and Back-Up Gun (BUG) divisions are further divided into two subcategories each.

In the following table, note that "Max Rounds Loaded" is a general maximum for all competitions.  Instructions for a stage may require a lower round count for that stage.  In the semi-automatic divisions, this refers to the maximum number of rounds allowed to be loaded in the magazine.  Unless stage instructions state otherwise, shooters may start with an additional round in the chamber.  Also note that "Other Firearm Restrictions" only lists the most significant firearm restrictions for a division.  See IDPA rulebook for an exhaustive list of rules.

Holsters
 Holster must be attached to a belt worn through belt loops. All but two belt loops must be used.
 Holster must hold the firearm with enough tension to allow the wearer to complete normal daily tasks without fear of losing the weapon
 Except for law enforcement officers competing using their duty equipment, the holster must be concealable
 Shoulder, ankle, and cross-draw holsters are not allowed due to safety concerns

See also
 List of shooting sports organizations
 Shooting sports
 International Practical Shooting Confederation
 United States Practical Shooting Association

Notes and references

External links 
 International Defensive Pistol Association
 IDPA Forum

Finding IDPA matches
 Practiscore

Handgun shooting sports
Organizations established in 1996
Shooting sports organizations
Companies based in Texas